Martin Hinterstocker Sr. (born 28 July 1954 in Holzkirchen) is an ice hockey player who played for the West German national team. He won a bronze medal at the 1976 Winter Olympics.

References

External links
 
 
 
 

1954 births
Living people
Berliner SC players
Düsseldorfer EG players
Ice hockey players at the 1976 Winter Olympics
Ice hockey players at the 1980 Winter Olympics
Olympic bronze medalists for West Germany
Olympic ice hockey players of West Germany
West German ice hockey right wingers
Olympic medalists in ice hockey
Medalists at the 1976 Winter Olympics
People from Miesbach (district)
Sportspeople from Upper Bavaria
German ice hockey right wingers